Steven L. Tuck is a professor of classics, who is currently head of classics at Miami University. He teaches many classics courses at Miami University, especially those relating to the arts. He received a Ph.D. in Classical Art and Archaeology from University of Michigan in 1997, and he is the author of the textbook A History of Roman Art.

In addition to his teaching, he has lectured the general public at Classics at the University of Colorado Boulder, Yale University, the University of Puget Sound, Baylor University and for the Getty Villa. He has also appeared in the media discussing classics, including in a 2019 feature for Atlas Obscura on the eruption of Mount Vesuvius in 79 C.E. and its impact on refugees and migration in the ancient world. For the Vergilian Society, he managed the Villa Vergiliana in Cumae, and organized educational programs there.

Awards and recognitions 
Tuck received the Excellence in Undergraduate Teaching Award from the Archaeological Institute of America for 2014.

Archaeological tours
Dr. Tuck leads educational journeys for Far Horizons Archaeological and Cultural trips 
 Steve Tuck's tour page Steve Tuck

References 

American classical scholars
Living people
Miami University faculty
University of Michigan alumni
Year of birth missing (living people)